The 1985 All-American Bowl was a college football postseason bowl game between the Georgia Tech Yellow Jackets and the Michigan State Spartans.

Background
The Spartans tied for fourth in the Big Ten Conference while the Yellow Jackets finished 2nd in the Atlantic Coast Conference.

Game summary
Mark Ingram, Sr caught a touchdown pass from Dave Yarema to give the Spartans a 7–0 lead with 2:03 left in the first half. Todd Rampley responded early in the second half on a touchdown plunge with 11:14 left in the 3rd. Ingram scored his second touchdown on a 27-yard pass from Yarema to make it 14–7 with 4:41 in the quarter. Georgia Tech narrowed the lead on a field foal by David Bell with 7:08 left in the game. However, a fumble by the Spartans was recovered by the Yellow Jackets at the 42 with five minutes remaining, giving them the ball in Michigan State territory. Six plays later, Malcolm King scored on a 5-yard touchdown run with 1:50 left to give Georgia Tech a 17–14 lead, which proved to be victory after Michigan State failed to get in range for the tie.  Malcolm King rushed for 122 yards on 16 carries. Mark Ingram, Sr caught 3 passes for 70 yards for the Spartans.

Aftermath
Georgia Tech did not reach another bowl until 1991. Michigan State reached the Rose Bowl in 1988.

The following year, the National Football Foundation and College Hall of Fame decided to relocate the game to Tampa, FL, beginning the Hall of Fame Bowl (now the Outback for sponsorship reasons). The game in Birmingham, AL remained, though renamed as the All-American Bowl.

Statistics

References

All-American Bowl
All-American Bowl
Georgia Tech Yellow Jackets football bowl games
Michigan State Spartans football bowl games
December 1985 sports events in the United States